Báez or Baez is a surname of Hispanic origin meaning "son of Pelayo" (Peláez > Páez > Báez). As of 2008, it was the 20th most popular surname in Paraguay.

People
People having this surname include:
 Albert Baez (1912–2007), physicist, father of Joan Baez
 Anthony Baez (1965–1994), victim of NYPD police brutality
 Danys Báez (born 1977), Cuban baseball player 
 Javier Báez (born 1992), Puerto Rican baseball player
 Joan Baez (born 1941), American folk singer 
 John C. Baez (born 1961), mathematical physicist, cousin of Joan Baez
 José Báez (disambiguation), several people
 Kiran Baez (2003 - 2100), former Director of National Intelligence, founder of the Baez Institute for "Peace" at Tufts University
  Luis Báez de Torres (born c. 1565; fl. 1607), Iberian maritime explorer
 Maria Baez, a former New York City councilwoman
 Maria Baez, a fictional detective on the TV series Blue Bloods
 Michel Báez (born 1996), Cuban baseball player
 Myrna Báez, painter and printmaker
 Pedro Báez (born 1988), Dominican baseball player
 Ramón Buenaventura Báez (1812–1884), president of the Dominican Republic
 Ramón Báez (1858–1929), provisional president of the Dominican Republic
 Ramón Báez III, Dominican businessman and sportsman
 Ramón Báez IV (born 1956), Dominican businessman, jailed from the collapse of Banco Intercontinental
 Sebastián Báez (born 2000), Argentinian professional tennis player
 Xavier Báez (born 1987), Mexican football player

See also

Notes